Men in Blazers is a New York City-based television show, podcast, and digital brand, founded, operated and hosted by Roger Bennett and Michael Davies covering global soccer and its reception in the United States. The two met at a wedding reception in New York, which prevented them from being able to watch the 2006 World Cup Final. Bennett noticed Davies sulking at the bar and struck up a conversation.

The show began as a podcast on the popular ESPN website Grantland. In 2010, the hosts were signed to produce a weekly television show for NBCSN, focusing on the English Premier League. The show entered its sixth season in August 2019. Since the television show's inception, the brand has expanded to cover sports outside of soccer, including the NFL; NHL; golf's Open Championship, Ryder Cup and Presidents Cup; and the Running of the Bulls in Pamplona, Spain.

The podcast, which has expanded from weekly soccer recaps to also include regular interviews with athletes and cultural icons, remains a fixture on the iTunes charts.

In May 2018, Bennett and Davies released "Encyclopedia Blazertannica: A Suboptimal Guide to Soccer, America's 'Sport of the Future' Since 1972," a book that hit the New York Times Bestseller list. It claims to be the first book in the history of publishing to have a tweed cover.

Guests 
The Men in Blazers television show and podcast have featured a wide range of celebrities, including:

Athletes 
Megan Rapinoe, 
DeAndre Hopkins, 
Alexander Ovechkin, 
Wayne Rooney, 
Alex Morgan, 
Andrew Luck, 
Carmelo Anthony, 
Lewis Hamilton, 
Rory McIlroy,
Steve Kerr,
Daryl Dike

Musicians 
Killer Mike, 
Diplo, 
Vampire Weekend, 
Mumford & Sons, 
Noel Gallagher,
Haim

Actors
Laura Linney, 
Will Ferrell, 
Dominic West, 
Diego Luna, 
Mike Myers, 
John Lithgow,
Anupam Kher

Cultural
Barry Hearn
John Oliver, 
James Corden, 
David Simon, 
Guy Ritchie, 
Seth Meyers, 
Hasan Minhaj,
Peter Moore

Live tours 
The duo have travelled the nation from coast to coast, playing sold-out summer live tours which have given them the ability to bring together thousands of American soccer fans to celebrate the World Cup, Women's World Cup, and Euros, along with guests who include Billy Beane, Waka Flocka, and Taylor Lewan.

The Annual Golden Blazer Award Show 
In the Encyclopedia Blazertannica, the Men in Blazers also explain that they give out a golden blazer once a year to someone they credit with helping grow soccer, especially in America. So far, the recipients are:

 2014 — Bob Ley, ESPN soccer and Outside the Lines host
 2015 — Julie Foudy, U.S. women's national team captain, FIFA Women's World Cup winner, Olympic gold medalist and ESPN soccer commentator and journalist
 2016 — Loretta Lynch, U.S. Attorney General and key proponent of the 2015 FIFA corruption case that resulted in the resignation of FIFA President Sepp Blatter
 2017 — Rebecca Lowe, NBC Premier League host
 2018 — Rob Stone, FOX soccer host
 2019 — Megan Rapinoe, U.S. women's national team co-captain, FIFA Women's World Cup winner, Olympic gold medalist
 2020 — Emmanuel Eboue

In 2019, Men in Blazers launched an American Premier League Player of the Year Award, given to America's favorite Premier League player. The award's inaugural recipient was Liverpool's Virgil Van Dijk.

References

External links
 
 
 
 

Association football television series
Sports podcasts